This article shows all participating team squads at the 2009 Final Four Women's Volleyball Cup, held from September 9 to September 13, 2009 in Lima, Peru.

Head Coach: Paulo Barros

Head Coach: Marcos Kwiek

Head Coach: Cheol Yong Kim

Head Coach: Hugh McCutcheon

References 
 NORCECA
 Fepecol.com

F
F